The Kawasaki Ninja is a name given to several series of Kawasaki sport bikes that started with the 1984 GPZ900R. Kawasaki Heavy Industries trademarked a version of the word Ninja in the form of a wordmark, a stylised script, for use on "motorcycles and spare parts thereof".



Motorcycles models

Four-cylinder 

 Kawasaki Ninja H2 SX (since 2018)
 Kawasaki Ninja H2 (since 2015)
 Kawasaki Ninja ZX-14 (ZZR1400; ZX-14R after 2012) (since 2006)
 Kawasaki Ninja ZX-12R (2000–2006)
 Kawasaki Ninja ZX-11 (ZZ-R1100) (1990–2001)
 Kawasaki Ninja ZX-10R (ZX1000) (since 2004)
 Kawasaki Ninja 1000 (Z1000SX) (since 2011)
 Kawasaki Ninja ZX-10 (Tomcat ZX-10) (1988–1990)
 Kawasaki Ninja 1000R (GPZ1000RX) (1986–1988)
 Kawasaki Ninja ZX-9R (1994–2003)
 Kawasaki Ninja 900 (GPZ900R) (1983–2003)
 Kawasaki Ninja ZX-7R and ZX-7RR (ZXR-750/ZXR-750R) (1989–2003)
 Kawasaki Ninja 750R (ZX750F/GPX750R) (1986–1991)
 Kawasaki Ninja ZX-6R (ZX600) (since 1995)
 Kawasaki Ninja 600 (ZZR600/ZX-6E) (1990–2008)
 Kawasaki Ninja 600R (GPZ600R/GPX600R) (1985–1997)
 Kawasaki Ninja ZX-4R/ZX-4RR (since 2023)
 Kawasaki GPZ400R (ZX400D) (1985–1990)
 Kawasaki Ninja ZX-4R/ZXR400 (1989–2003)
 Kawasaki Ninja ZX-25R (since 2020)
 Kawasaki Ninja ZX-2R/ZXR250 (1989–2004)

Two-cylinder 

 Kawasaki Ninja 650R (ER-6f/EX-6) (since 2006) 
 Kawasaki Ninja 500R (EX500/GPZ500S) (1986–2009)
 Kawasaki Ninja 400R (ER-4f) (since 2011)
 Kawasaki Ninja 400 (EX400) (since 2018)
 Kawasaki Ninja 300 (EX300) (2013–2017)
 Kawasaki Ninja 250R (EX250) (since 1986)

Single-cylinder 

 Kawasaki Ninja 250SL (BX250) (since 2015)
 Kawasaki Ninja ZX-150RR (KR-150/KRR 150/Serpico) (1992–2017; 2-stroke)
 Kawasaki Ninja 125 (BX125) (since 2018)
 Kawasaki Ninja 80RR (AR80K) (1992–1998;  2-stroke)

Racing 

 Kawasaki Ninja H2R (since 2015)
 Kawasaki Ninja ZX-RR (2002–2009) MotoGP

See also 
 Kawasaki GPZ series
 Kawasaki Z

References

External links 

 

Ninja
Sport bikes